College Point may refer to a place in the United States:

 College Point, Florida, part of the city of Lynn Haven
 College Point, Queens, New York